Scytalognatha is a genus of moths belonging to the family Tortricidae.

Species
Scytalognatha abluta Diakonoff, 1956

References
tortricidae.com

Polyorthini
Tortricidae genera
Taxa named by Alexey Diakonoff